Ove Hansen (equestrian)
 Ove Hansen (footballer)